Smardzewo  (German Schmarsow) is a village in the administrative district of Gmina Sławno, within Sławno County, West Pomeranian Voivodeship, in north-western Poland.

For the history of the region, see History of Pomerania.

The village has a population of 378.

Notable residents
 Wilhelm Bohnstedt (1888–1947), general

References

Smardzewo